The Basketball Federation of Slovenia also known as KZS is the governing body of basketball in Slovenia. It was founded in 1950 as a member of the larger Yugoslav Basketball Federation (see also: Basketball in Yugoslavia). In 1992, KZS joined the International Basketball Federation (FIBA) on its own.

The Basketball Federation of Slovenia operates the Slovenia men's national team and Slovenia women's national team. They organize national competitions in Slovenia, for both the men's and women's senior teams and also the youth national basketball teams.

The top professional league in Slovenia is the Premier A Slovenian Basketball League.

See also 
 Slovenia men's national basketball team
 Slovenia women's national basketball team
 Slovenia men's national under-20 basketball team
 Slovenia men's national under-19 basketball team
 Slovenia men's national under-17 basketball team

References

External links 
 Official website 
 Slovenia at FIBA site

Fed
Basketball governing bodies in Europe
Basketball
Sports organizations established in 1950